Auguste Marion (11 July 1876 – 1 July 1955) was a French sport shooter who competed in the 1912 Summer Olympics. He was born in Paris.

In 1912 he was a member of the French team which finished fourth in the team free rifle event. In the 300 metre military rifle, three positions competition he finished 40th and in the 600 metre free rifle event he finished 63rd.

References

1876 births
1955 deaths
French male sport shooters
ISSF rifle shooters
Olympic shooters of France
Shooters at the 1912 Summer Olympics